In mathematics, Esakia duality is the dual equivalence between the category of Heyting algebras and the category of Esakia spaces. Esakia duality provides an order-topological representation of Heyting algebras via Esakia spaces.

Let Esa denote the category of Esakia spaces and Esakia morphisms.

Also, for each , let }, and let  denote the topology on  generated by }.

Furthermore, each Esakia space is isomorphic in Esa to the Esakia dual of some Heyting algebra.

This representation of Heyting algebras by means of Esakia spaces is functorial and yields a dual equivalence between the categories
 HA of Heyting algebras and Heyting algebra homomorphisms
and
 Esa of Esakia spaces and Esakia morphisms.

Theorem: HA is dually equivalent to Esa.

The duality can also be expressed in terms of spectral spaces, where it says that the category of Heyting algebras is dually equivalent 
to the category of Heyting spaces.

See also
 Duality theory for distributive lattices

References

Topology
Lattice theory
Duality theories